Packington Old Hall is a 17th-century manor house situated at Great Packington, near Meriden, Warwickshire. It is a Grade II* listed building.

An original manor house was rebuilt in red brick in 1679 by the Sir Clement Fisher, 2nd Baronet. In 1693 his nephew, the third baronet built another larger mansion on the estate. The new house became known as Packington Hall and from 1729 the new house has been the seat of the Earl of Aylesford.

References

External links 
Photos of Packington Old Hall and surrounding area on geograph

Grade II* listed buildings in Warwickshire
Country houses in Warwickshire
Grade II* listed houses